In grammar, a preparatory subject or anticipatory subject is a subject which represents a verb clause later in the sentence. It as a preparatory subject is "commonly used in speech and writing, especially when the subject is longer than the complement and is better placed at the end of the sentence".

Examples
It is fun to play the piano 
is equivalent to 
Playing the piano is fun
"It" in the first sentence is a preparatory subject, referring to the clause "to play the piano".

Notes

External links
English grammar: It as a preparatory subject

Grammar